Trifolium striatum, the knotted clover, soft trefoil, is a flowering plant species in the pea and bean family  Fabaceae.

References

Flora of the United Kingdom
striatum
Plants described in 1753
Taxa named by Carl Linnaeus